Inglewood, also known as the Thomas and Emma Jane Donohoe Cockerill House and Petticoat House, is a historic home located at Glasgow, Howard County, Missouri.  It was built in 1857, and is a two-story, Italianate style red brick dwelling with a two-story rear ell.  It features a full-width front porch with square wooden columns.

It was listed on the National Register of Historic Places in 1990.

References

Houses on the National Register of Historic Places in Missouri
Italianate architecture in Missouri
Houses completed in 1857
Buildings and structures in Howard County, Missouri
National Register of Historic Places in Howard County, Missouri